Pasib (also Romanized as Pāsīb and Pā-ye Sīb; also known as Pāy Sīb) is a village in Moezziyeh Rural District, Chatrud District, Kerman County, Kerman Province, Iran. At the 2006 census, its population was 86, in 28 families.

References 

Populated places in Kerman County